Mohamed Allalou (born September 28, 1973) is an Algerian boxer (From Thénia in kabylia). He competed in the Men's Light Welterweight division at the 2000 Summer Olympics and won the bronze medal. He also twice participated in the Summer Olympics, starting in 1996.

1996 Olympic results
Defeated Peter Bulinga (Kenya) 17-3
Defeated Jacek Bielski (Poland) 19-8
Lost to Fethi Missaoui (Tunisia) 15-16

2000 Olympic results
Defeated Lukáš Konečný (Czech Republic) 17-9
Defeated Ben Neequaye (Ghana) 15-6
Defeated Sven Paris (Italy) 22-8
Lost to Muhammad Abdullaev (Uzbekistan) RSC

Career

Olympic Games 
  Olympic Games 2000 ( Sydney, Australia ) (- 64 kg)
 Quarter-finals OlympicGames1996 (Atlanta, USA) (- 63,5 kg )

African Amateur Boxing Championships 
  African Amateur Boxing Championships 1998 (  Algiers, Algeria ) (- 63,5 kg )
  African Amateur Boxing Championships 2001 (  Port Louis, Mauritius)  (- 63,5 kg )
  African Olympic Qualifications 1996  (- 60 kg)

Mediterranean Games 
  Mediterranean Games 1997 ( Bari, Italy) (- 60 kg)
  Mediterranean Games 2001 ( Tunis, Tunisia)  (- 63,5 kg )

All-Africa Games 
  All-Africa Games 1999 (Johannesburg, South Africa)  (- 63,5 kg )

Pan Arab Games 
  Pan Arab Games 1997 ( Beirut, Lebanon) (- 60 kg) 
  Pan Arab Games 1999 (Amman, Jordan)  (- 63,5 kg )

World Amateur Boxing Championships 
 Preliminaries 1/32 World Amateur Boxing Championships 1997 ( Budapest, Hungary )  (- 60 kg)
 Preliminaries 1/16 World Amateur Boxing Championships 2001( Belfast, Northern Ireland)  (- 63,5 kg )
 Preliminaries 1/32 World Amateur Boxing Championships 2003  (Bangkok, Thailand)  (- 64 kg)

International tournaments 
  Giraldo Cordova Cardin Tournament (Camaguey, Cuba) 1996 (60 kg)
  Muhammad Ali Cup ( Louisville, USA ) 1997 (60 kg)
  President's Cup ( Sanur (Bali), Indonesia ) 2000 (63,5 kg )
  Egyptian International Championships ( Cairo, Egypt ) 2002 (67 kg)

External links

1973 births
People from Thénia
People from Thénia District
People from Boumerdès Province
Light-welterweight boxers
Olympic boxers of Algeria
Boxers at the 1996 Summer Olympics
Boxers at the 2000 Summer Olympics
Living people
Olympic bronze medalists for Algeria
Olympic medalists in boxing
Algerian male boxers
Medalists at the 2000 Summer Olympics
Mediterranean Games gold medalists for Algeria
Mediterranean Games bronze medalists for Algeria
Competitors at the 1997 Mediterranean Games
Competitors at the 2001 Mediterranean Games
African Games silver medalists for Algeria
African Games medalists in boxing
Mediterranean Games medalists in boxing
Competitors at the 1999 All-Africa Games
21st-century Algerian people